Colleen Taylor (born ) is an American journalist.

Taylor first appeared in CosmoGIRL! as the teen magazine's first political correspondent. Starting in May 2004, her monthly column, "Born to Vote," covered her experiences on the campaign trail during the 2004 presidential election. In  October 2004, she was named one of the YouthVote Coalition's "30 Under 30," 30 people under the age of 30 who the organization said "continue to increase civic participation, build responsive government, or promote public awareness about the value of participation in democracy through research or discovery."

References

External links
 May 2004 "Born to Vote" column

Living people
American women journalists
1984 births
21st-century American women